N. minuta  may refer to:
 Naticopsis minuta, an extinct sea snail species in the genus Naticopsis and the family Neritopsidae
 Neohoratia minuta, a very small freshwater snail species endemic to Switzerland
 Nepotilla minuta, a sea snail species

See also
 Minuta